Alfred Eduard Frauenfeld (18 May 1898 – 10 May 1977) was an Austrian Nazi leader. An engineer by occupation, he was associated with the pro-Nazi Germany wing of Austrian Nazism.

Activism in Austria
Frauenfeld was the son of a privy councillor and during the First World War he served on the Italian front as an Officer Candidate in the rank of a sergeant with the pay grade of a lance corporal with the k.u.k. Fliegerkompanie Nr. 48. Working variously as a mason and a bank clerk, Frauenfeld was initially a member of the Christian Social Party.

However Frauenfeld first came to prominence in the politics of Vienna, initially in Hermann Hiltl's movement, before becoming a highly influential figure amongst the city's Nazis during the late 1920s. He seems to have joined the Austrian Nazi Party in August 1929 and very quickly took on the role of Bezirksleiter (District Leader) for the Wieden District of Vienna. He was confirmed by Adolf Hitler as Nazi Gauleiter of all Vienna in 1930. In this role he became hugely active, organising over 1000 propaganda meetings in three years and founding a party newspaper Der Kampfruf with his own money in 1930, before ultimately running four Nazi dailies and four weeklies. Under his command the Nazis became an important force in Vienna, winning almost ten times as many votes in the 1932 elections as they did in 1930. From a few hundred members when he took over, Frauenfeld had expanded the Viennese party to 40,000 members by 1934. Frauenfeld's success saw him considered for the post of leader of the Austrian Nazi Party in 1931, although ultimately Theodor Habicht was chosen for the role by Gregor Strasser on Hitler's advice. Despite his success as an organiser Frauenfeld also had a reputation for a domineering and impolite temperament, something which ensured a frosty relationship with other leading Austrian Nazis Josef Leopold and Alfred Proksch.

Frauenfeld became associated with the terrorist activities of the Nazis within Austria and in June 1933 he was held at Wöllersdorf internment camp. He was also closely involved with Habicht in the abortive putsch of 1934. Engelbert Dollfuss had actually offered Frauenfeld a cabinet post in May 1934 in an attempt to avoid rebellion but he refused the offer and went to Germany to become involved in the plot. He would remain in Germany after the plot failed and in 1936 was appointed to the Reichstag as member for Düsseldorf East.

Under the Nazis
Following the Anschluss, of which Frauenfeld had long been an advocate, the popular local was a leading choice for the role of Gauleiter of Vienna. However, in what proved to be a fraught selection process Frauenfeld lost out to Odilo Globocnik, an old rival from Carinthia. He was not sidelined completely however and found a number of positions within the Nazi administration. He was something of a patron of the arts and enjoyed a close relationship with the conductor Clemens Krauss and had also been an actor and so within the Reich Chamber of Culture Frauenfeld served as managing director of the Theatre Chamber.

Later he served under Erich Koch as the General Commissar for Crimea and in this role Prof Dietrich Orlow grouped him along with the Commissar for Belarus Wilhelm Kube as being a "rehab" - that is to say Nazis who had fallen from grace but were able to make a comeback in the eastern administration. Frauenfeld did not share the ruthlessness of Koch and the Austrian's unwillingness to follow a policy of brutality towards the local population led to a series of public spats between the two men. Whilst his time in charge saw a surprisingly high level of co-operation between the occupation government and the local administration, it has been argued that this was more the work of Erich von Manstein and that Frauenfeld instead spent most of his time in the Crimea trying to prove the Gothic origins of local culture. He had also hoped to transfer the South Tyrolean population to the region in order to unite them with their kin as a common Nazi belief suggested that the German inhabitants of South Tyrol were descendants of Goths. Frauenfeld further wished to settle the Volga Germans and the Russian Germans of North America to the peninsula. Frauenfeld's role had originally been intended for his fellow Austrian Josef Leopold although his death left the position open. He re-emerged in Vienna in 1945 as an official spokesman for the Gau.

Post-war activity
Frauenfeld, who finished the war in Germany, was sentenced in absentia to 15 years imprisonment by a Vienna court in 1947. According to a German secret service report on 22 July 1949 Frauenfeld joined a secret "Bruderschaft" of crypto-neo Nazis in Hamburg where he was manager of a building firm. He also was close to Gustav Adolf Scheel who was active in similar secret societies. He was arrested in February 1953 for his plotting against the government although a lack of evidence saw the charges dismissed. He lived out his days in Hamburg, dying in 1977.

References

External links
 

1898 births
1977 deaths
Male actors from Vienna
Christian Social Party (Austria) politicians
Gauleiters
Members of the Reichstag of Nazi Germany
Militant League for German Culture members
Austrian male stage actors
Reichskommissariat Ukraine
Austro-Hungarian Air Service personnel
Austro-Hungarian military personnel of World War I
Austrian Nazis convicted of war crimes
Nazis convicted in absentia